Joan de Hamel (31 March 1924  – 28 July 2011) was a New Zealand children's writer.  She grew up in London, England and later moved to the Otago Peninsula.  In addition to her writing she worked as a teacher, raised a family, and bred Angora goats.

Writing

De Hamel won the 1979 Esther Glen Award for Take the Long Path (1978), and the 1985 A.W. Reed Memorial Award for Hemi's Pet (1985).

Other books written include:
 X Marks the Spot (1973)
 The Third Eye (1987)
 Hideaway (1992)
 Hemi and the Shorty Pyjamas (1996)

References

1924 births
New Zealand writers
2011 deaths
New Zealand children's writers
New Zealand women children's writers
British emigrants to New Zealand